The  ("Good Walkers") were members of an agrarian visionary tradition in the Friuli district of Northeastern Italy during the 16th and 17th centuries. The  claimed to travel out of their bodies while asleep to struggle against malevolent witches in order to ensure good crops for the season to come.

According to Early Modern records,  were believed to have been born with a caul on their head, which gave them the ability to take part in nocturnal visionary traditions that occurred on specific Thursdays during the year. During these visions, it was believed that their spirits rode upon various animals into the sky and off to places in the countryside. Here they would take part in various games and other activities with other , and battle malevolent witches who threatened both their crops and their communities using sticks of sorghum. When not taking part in these visionary journeys,  were also believed to have magical powers that could be used for healing.

In 1575, the  first came to the attention of the Friulian Church authorities when a village priest, Don Bartolomeo Sgabarizza, began investigating the claims made by the  Paolo Gasparotto. Although Sgabarizza soon abandoned his investigations, in 1580 the case was reopened by the inquisitor Fra' Felice de Montefalco, who interrogated not only Gasparotto but also a variety of other local  and spirit mediums, ultimately condemning some of them for the crime of heresy. Under pressure by the Inquisition, these nocturnal spirit travels (which often included sleep paralysis) were assimilated to the diabolised stereotype of the witches' Sabbath, leading to the extinction of the  cult. The Inquisition's denunciation of the visionary tradition led to the term "" becoming synonymous with the term "" (meaning "witch") in Friulian folklore right through to the 20th century.

The first historian to study the  tradition was the Italian Carlo Ginzburg, who began an examination of the surviving trial records from the period in the early 1960s, culminating in the publication of his book The Night Battles: Witchcraft and Agrarian Cults in the Sixteenth and Seventeenth Centuries (1966, English translation 1983). He furthermore argued that it was only one surviving part of a much wider European tradition of visionary experiences that had its origins in the pre-Christian period, identifying similarities with Livonian werewolf beliefs. Various historians have alternately built on or challenged aspects of Ginzburg's interpretation.

Members 
 
The  – a term meaning "good walkers" – were members of a folk tradition in the Friuli region.

The , who included both males and females, were individuals who believed that they ensured the protection of their community and its crops. The  reported leaving their bodies in the shape of mice, cats, rabbits, or butterflies. The men mostly reported flying into the clouds battling against witches to secure fertility for their community; the women more often reported attending great feasts.

Specifically, it was a widely held belief that those who in later life became  were born with a caul, or amniotic sac, wrapped around their heads. In the folklore of Friuli at the time, cauls were imbued with magical properties, being associated with the ability to protect soldiers from harm, to cause an enemy to withdraw, and to help lawyers win their legal cases. In subsequent centuries, a related folkloric tradition found across much of Italy held to the belief that witches had been born with a caul.

From surviving records, it is apparent that members of the  first learned about its traditions during infancy, usually from their mothers. For this reason, historian Norman Cohn asserted that the  tradition highlights how "not only the waking thoughts but the trance experiences of individuals can be deeply conditioned by the generally accepted beliefs of the society in which they live".

Visionary journeys 

On Thursdays between the Ember days, periods of fasting for the Catholic Church, the  claimed their spirits would leave their bodies at night in the form of small animals. The spirits of the men would go to the fields to fight evil witches. The  men fought with fennel stalks, while the witches were armed with sorghum stalks (sorghum was used for witches' brooms, and the "brooms' sorghum" was one of the most current type of sorghum). If the men prevailed, the harvest would be plentiful.

The female  performed other sacred tasks. When they left their bodies they traveled to a great feast, where they danced, ate and drank with a procession of spirits, animals and faeries, and learned who amongst the villagers would die in the next year. In one account, this feast was presided over by a woman, "the abbess", who sat in splendour on the edge of a well. Carlo Ginzburg has compared these spirit assemblies with others reported by similar groups elsewhere in Italy and Sicily, which were also presided over by a goddess-figure who taught magic and divination.

The earliest accounts of the  journeys, dating from 1575, did not contain any of the elements then associated with the diabolic witches' sabbath; there was no worshipping of the Devil (a figure who was not even present), no renunciation of Christianity, no trampling of crucifixes and no defilement of sacraments.

Relationship with witches 

Inquisition and persecution

Sgabarizza's investigation: 1575 
In early 1575, Paolo Gasparotto, a male  who lived in the village of Iassico (modern spelling: Giassìcco), gave a charm to a miller from Brazzano named Pietro Rotaro, in the hope of healing his son, who had fallen sick from some unknown illness. This event came to the attention of the local priest, Don Bartolomeo Sgabarizza, who was intrigued by the use of such folk magic, and called Gasparotto to him to learn more.

He went on to reveal more about his  brethren, relating that "on Thursdays during the Ember Days of the year [they] were forced to go with these witches to many places, such as Cormons, in front of the church at Giassìcco, and even into the countryside around Verona," where they "fought, played, leaped about, and rode various animals", as well as taking part in an activity during which "the women beat the men who were with them with sorghum stalks, while the men had only bunches of fennel."

Don Sgabarizza was concerned with such talk of witchcraft, and on 21 March 1575, he appeared as a witness before both the vicar general, Monsignor Jacopo Maracco, and the Inquisitor Fra Giulio d'Assis, a member of the Order of the Minor Conventuals, at the monastery of San Francesco of Cividale del Friuli, in the hope that they could offer him guidance in how to proceed in this situation. He brought Gasparotto with him, who readily furnished more information in front of the Inquisitor, relating that after taking part in their games, "the witches, warlocks and vagabonds" would pass in front of people's houses, looking for "clean, clear water" that they would then drink. According to Gasparotto, if the witches could not find any clean water to drink, they would "go into the cellars and overturn all the wine".

Sgabarizza did not initially believe Gasparotto's claim that these events had actually occurred. Not long after, on the Monday following Easter, Sgabarizza visited Giassìcco in order to say Mass to the assembled congregation, and following the ritual stayed among the locals for a feast held in his honour.

Montefalco's investigation: 1580–1582

Gasparotto and Moduco 
The questioning over, Gasparotto was imprisoned.

On 28 June, Gasparotto was brought in for interrogation again. Gasparotto went on to accuse two individuals, one from Gorizia and the other from Chiana, of being witches, and was subsequently released by Montefalco on the proviso that he return for further questioning at a later date. This eventually came about on 26 September, taking place at the monastery of San Francesco in Udine. For Montefalco, the introduction of this element led him to suspect that the actions of Gasparotto were themselves heretical and satanic, and his method of interrogation became openly suggestive, putting forward the idea that the angel was actually a demon in disguise.

As historian Carlo Ginzburg related, Montefalco had begun to warp Gasparotto's testimony of the  journey to fit the established clerical image of the diabolical witches' sabbat, while under the stress of interrogation and imprisonment, Gasparotto himself was losing his self-assurance and beginning to question "the reality of his beliefs". Several days later, Gasparotto openly told Montefalco that he believed that "the apparition of that angel was really the devil tempting me, since you have told me he can transform himself into an angel". When Moduco was also summoned to Montefalco, on 2 October 1580, he went on to announce the same thing, proclaiming that the Devil must have deceived him into going on the nocturnal journey which he believed was performed for good.

Having both confessed to Montefalco that their nocturnal journeying had been caused by the devil, both Gasparotto and Moduco were released, pending sentencing for their crime at a later date. Due to a jurisdictional conflict between the Cividale commissioner and the patriarch's vicar, the pronouncement of Gasparotto and Moduco's punishment was postponed until 26 November 1581. Both denounced as heretics, they were spared from excommunication but condemned to six months' imprisonment, and furthermore ordered to offer prayers and penances to God on certain days of the year, including the Ember Days, in order that He might forgive their sins. However, their penalties were soon remitted, on the condition that they remain within the city of Cividale for a fortnight.

Anna la Rossa, Donna Aquilina and Caterina la Guercia 
Gasparotto and Moduco would not be the only victims of Montefalco's investigations, however, for during late 1581 he had heard of a widow living in Udine named Anna la Rossa (the Red one). Initially denying that she had such an ability to the inquisitor, she eventually relented and told him of how she believed that she could see the dead, and how she sold their messages to members of the local community willing to pay, using the money in order to alleviate the poverty of her family. Although Montefalco intended to interrogate her again at a later date, the trial ultimately remained permanently unfinished.

That year, Montefalco also took an interest in the claims regarding the wife of a tailor living in Udine who allegedly had the power to see the dead and to cure diseases with the use of spells and potions. Known among locals as Donna Aquilina, she was said to have become relatively rich through offering her services as a professional healer, but when she learned that she was under suspicion from the Holy Inquisition, she fled the city, and Montefalco did not initially set out to locate her. Later, on 26 August 1583, Montefalco traveled to Aquilina's home in order to interrogate her, but she fled and hid in a neighbouring house. She was finally brought in for interrogation on 27 October, in which she defended her practices, but claimed that she was neither a  nor a witch.

In 1582, Montefalco had also begun investigating a Cividale widow named Caterina la Guercia (the One-eyed one), whom he had accused of practicing "various maleficent arts".

Subsequent depositions and denunciations: 1583–1629 
In 1583, an anonymous individual denounced a herdsman, Toffolo di Buri of Pieris, to the Holy Office at Udine. The village of Pieris was near Monfalcone, across the Isonzo river and therefore outside of Friuli; it was nevertheless within the diocese of Aquileia.

Having heard this testimony, the members of the Holy Office of Udine met on 18 March to discuss the situation; they requested that the Mayor of Monfalcone, Antonia Zorzi, arrest Toffolo and send him to Udine. While Zorzi did orchestrate the arrest, he had no men spare to transfer the prisoner, and so let him go. In November 1586, the inquisitor of Aquileia decided to reinvestigate the matter, and travelled to Monfalcone, but discovered that Toffolo had moved away from the area over a year before.

On 1 October 1587, a priest known as Don Vincenzo Amorosi of Cesana denounced a midwife named Caterina Domenatta to the inquisitor of Aquileia and Concordia, Fra Giambattista da Perugia. Lambasting Domenatta as a "guilty sorceress", he claimed that she had encouraged mothers to put their newborn children on a spit in order to prevent them from becoming either  or witches. Agreeing to investigate, the inquisitor travelled to Monfalcone in January 1588 to gain depositions against the midwife. When he came to interrogating Domenatta, she openly admitted to the practice, and was condemned to public penance and an abjuration.

Claiming that she wanted to unburden her conscience, Busetto informed the commissioner that she had visited the village, where she met a friend whose child was injured.

Agrigolante also named several other  who lived locally, including the village priest and a woman named Narda Peresut. Busetto proceeded to seek out Peresut, who admitted to being a  but who stated that she performed her healing magic in Gao to avoid prosecution from the Inquisition. Busetto would inform the commissioner that she did not believe any of these claims, but while he agreed to investigate further, there is no evidence that he ever did. That same year, a self-professed  named Bastian Petricci of Percoto was also denounced to the Holy Office, although it is not recorded that they took any action on the issue.

In 1606, Giambattista Valento, an artisan from Palmanova, went to the superintendent general of the  Andrea Garzoni, and informed him of his belief that his wife had been bewitched. Garzoni was concerned, and sent the inquisitor general, Fra Gerolamo Asteo, to Palmanova to investigate. Talking to Gasparo, Asteo heard the stories of the nocturnal journeys, but the young  was insistent that they served God rather than the devil. Gasparo proceeded to name some of the villagers as witches, but the inquisitor did not believe him, and brought the case to a close.

In 1609 this was followed by the denunciation of another , a peasant named Bernardo of Santa Maria la Longa, to the religious authorities. In 1614, a woman named Franceschina of Frattuzze arrived at the monastery of San Francesco in Portogruaro in order to denounce a folk magician named Marietta Trevisana of Giai as a witch.

In 1618, a woman from Latisana, Maria Panzona, was arrested for theft. She proceeded to accuse a number of local women of being witches, but when questioned further in January 1619 admitted that she had paid homage to the devil, but only to gain powers which she used to help people. She was subsequently moved to Venice, there to be tried for heresy in front of the Holy Office, and two women whom she accused of witchcraft were also summoned. Here, Panzona denied ever honouring the devil, insisting that she and other  served Jesus Christ.

The members of the Holy Office did not believe that the stories she related ever took place, allowing the two accused witches to go free, and condemning Panzona to a three-year prison sentence for heresy. In 1621, a wealthy man named Alessandro Marchetto of Udine submitted a memorandum to the Holy Office accusing both a fourteen-year-old boy and a local shepherd named Giovanni of being , each of whom he had previously tried to employ to cure his own cousin, whom it was believed had been bewitched by sorcery.

In February 1622 the inquisitor of Aquileia, Fra Domenico Vico of Osimo was informed that a beggar and  named Lunardo Badou had been accusing various individuals of being witches in the area of Gagliano, Cividale del Friuli, and Rualis. Badou had become unpopular locally as a result, with the inquisitor not taking his claims seriously and proceeding to ignore the situation.

In May 1629 Francesco Brandis, an official at Cividale, sent a letter to the inquisitor of Aquileia informing him that a twenty-year-old  had been arrested for theft and was thus due to be transferred to Venice.

Legacy

Folk terminology 

Historical investigation and interpretation 
During the 1960s, the Italian historian Carlo Ginzburg was searching through the Archepiscopal Archives of Udine when he came across the 16th and 17th century trial records which documented the interrogation of several  and other folk magicians. Historian John Martin of Trinity University in San Antonio, Texas would later characterize this lucky find as the sort of "discovery most historians only dream of".

Since 1970, the trend for interpreting elements of Early Modern witchcraft belief as having ancient origins proved popular among scholars operating in continental Europe, but far less so than in the Anglophone world of Great Britain and the United States, where scholars were far more interested in understanding these witchcraft beliefs in their contemporary contexts, such as their connection to gender and class relations. Various scholars were critical of Ginzburg's interpretation.

Popular culture 
 The Benandanti are a major force in Elizabeth Hand's urban fantasy Waking the Moon (1994).
 The Benandanti are referenced in Kelley Armstrong's paranormal fantasy Waking the Witch (2010) in her Women of the Otherworld series. Two of the main characters are also Benandanti in The Calling (2012) from her Darkest Powers series.
 A concept very similar to the Benandanti, and based upon them, appears in Guy Gavriel Kay's historic fantasy Tigana (1990).
 Hector Plasm is a comic book character published occasionally through Image Comics (first appearing in 2003) who is a modern portrayal of a Benandanti.
 The Benandanti are a secret society of individuals in the old World of Darkness, part of the Wraith: The Oblivion (1994–1996) game line, who cross the wall between the lands of the living and the dead while in trances.
 There is a similar "Hound of God" character in Neil Gaiman's fantasy novel The Graveyard Book (2008).
 The Benandanti are also featured in a haunted attraction in Mesa, Arizona, called Shadowlands.
 The "Nightwalkers" chapter of the 5th Edition Ars Magica supplement Hedge Magic Revised Edition (2008) details the Benedanti and related traditions as playable magic traditions.
 The Benandanti appear in Majgull Axelsson's novel April Witch (1997).
 The Benandanti are a major part of the backstory of the manga Pilgrim Jäger (2002–2006).
 The Benandanti are the subject of Nicole Maggi's young adult Twin Willows trilogy (2014–2016).
 "The Amazing Benandanti" was a short story by Anita Marie Moscoso featuring a female American sideshow escape artist of the same name.
 The Benandanti play an important, mostly antagonistic role in the 2020 Netflix series Luna Nera, where they are portrayed as more conventional folk witch hunters.
 The Benandanti play an important, mostly antagonistic role in the 2021 Netflix film , where they are portrayed as zombie hunters.

Connections and origins

A pre-Christian shamanistic survival? 
In The Night Battles, Ginzburg argues that the  tradition was connected to "a larger complex of traditions" that were spread "from Alsace to Hesse and from Bavaria to Switzerland", all of which revolved around "the myth of nocturnal gatherings" presided over by a goddess figure, varyingly known as Perchta, Holda, Abundia, Satia, Herodias, Venus or Diana. He also noted that "almost identical" beliefs could be found in Livonia (modern Latvia and Estonia), and that because of this geographic spread "it may not be too daring to suggest that in antiquity these beliefs may once have covered much of central Europe".

Other historians were sceptical of Ginzburg's theories. Echoing these views in 1999 was English historian Ronald Hutton, who stated that Ginzburg's claim that the  visionary traditions were a survival from pre-Christian practices was an idea resting on "imperfect material and conceptual foundations".

Explaining his reasoning, Hutton remarked that "dreams do not self-evidently constitute rituals, and shared dream-imagery does not constitute a 'cult'," before noting that Ginzburg's "assumption" that "what was being dreamed about in the sixteenth century had in fact been acted out in religious ceremonies" dating to "pagan times" was entirely "an inference of his own". He thought that this approach was a "striking late application" of "the ritual theory of myth", a discredited anthropological idea associated particularly with Jane Ellen Harrison's 'Cambridge group' and Sir James Frazer.

Related traditions 

Historian Carlo Ginzburg posits a relationship between the  cult and the shamanism of the Baltic and Slavic cultures, a result of diffusion from a central Eurasian origin, possibly 6,000 years ago. This explains, in his opinion, the similarities between the Italian  cult and a distant case in Livonia concerning a benevolent werewolf.

In 1692 in Jürgensburg, Livonia, an area near the Baltic Sea, an old man named Theiss was tried for being a werewolf. His defense was that his spirit (and that of others) transformed into werewolves in order to fight demons and prevent them from stealing grain from the village. On 10 October 1692, Theiss was sentenced to ten whip strikes on charges of superstition and idolatry.

References

Footnotes

Bibliography

External links 
The American Historical Review
The Burning Times Encyclopedia
Mediterranean Food History
The Benandanti: Witchcraft and Agrarian Cults between 16th and 17th centuries in Italy

Fertility
Witchcraft in Italy
16th century in Italy
17th century in Italy
Witch trials in Italy